Polk Township, Iowa may refer to one of the following places:
 Polk Township, Benton County, Iowa
 Polk Township, Bremer County, Iowa
 Polk Township, Jefferson County, Iowa
 Polk Township, Shelby County, Iowa
 Polk Township, Taylor County, Iowa
 Polk Township, Wapello County, Iowa

See also

Polk Township (disambiguation)

Iowa township disambiguation pages